Greenwood is a city in and the county seat of Greenwood County, South Carolina, United States. The population in the 2020 United States Census was 22,545 down from 23,222 at the 2010 census. The city is home to Lander University.

Geography and Climate
Greenwood is located slightly northwest of the center of Greenwood County.

U.S. Routes 25, 178 and 221 pass through the eastern side of the city, bypassing the downtown area. US 25 leads north  to Greenville and south  to Augusta, Georgia, US 178 leads northwest  to Anderson and southeast  to Saluda, and US 221 leads northeast  to Laurens and southwest  to McCormick.

The area around Greenwood is locally billed as the "Lakelands", due to several lakes for recreational fishing and diverse terrain for hiking trails.

Demographics

2020 census

As of the 2020 United States census, there were 22,545 people, 8,772 households, and 4,878 families residing in the city.

2000 census
As of the census 2000, there were 22,071 people, 8,496 households, and 5,174 families residing in the city. The population density was 1,612.1 people per square mile (622.5/km2). There were 9,373 housing units at an average density of 684.6 per square mile (264.3/km2). The racial makeup of the city was 50.10% White, 45.51% African American, 0.19% Native American, 0.87% Asian, 0.07% Pacific Islander, 2.41% from other races, and 0.85% from two or more races. Hispanic or Latino of any race were 6.52% of the population.

There were 8,496 households, out of which 28.6% had children under the age of 18 living with them, 34.5% were married couples living together, 21.0% had a female householder with no husband present, and 39.1% were non-families. 32.4% of all households were made up of individuals, and 12.9% had someone living alone who was 65 years of age or older. The average household size was 2.41 and the average family size was 3.05.

In the city, the population was spread out, with 24.7% under the age of 18, 15.2% from 18 to 24, 27.3% from 25 to 44, 17.6% from 45 to 64, and 15.2% who were 65 years of age or older. The median age was 32 years. For every 100 females, there were 86.6 males. For every 100 females age 18 and over, there were 82.5 males.

The median income for a household in the city was $26,284, and the median income for a family was $32,573. Males had a median income of $26,477 versus $21,476 for females. The per capita income for the city was $14,347. About 22.2% of families and 40.4% of the population were below the poverty line, including 34.4% of those under age 18 and 18.0% of those age 65 or over.

Economy
The most common employment sectors for residents of Greenwood are manufacturing, retail trade, and healthcare and social assistance.

In 2015, the Greenwood educational institution with the largest number of graduating students was Lander University, with 494 graduates.

The median property value in Greenwood grew from $86,800 in 2014 to $87,800 in 2015.

67.4% of the city population over the age of sixteen is in the civilian labor force.

As of September 2017, the unemployment rate in Greenwood County was 4.0%.

Arts and culture

South Carolina Festival of Flowers
Greenwood's first South Carolina Festival of Flowers was held in the summer of 1968 to coincide with the 100th anniversary celebration of George W. Park Seed Company. The festival was the brainchild of what was known then as the Tourist and Conventions Committee of the Greenwood Chamber of Commerce. Chamber Director Al Parker and committee members recognized that Park Seed Company hosted "grower days" each year and that hundreds of professional flower growers would come to Greenwood to meander through Park Seed's famous trial gardens (the gardens closed in 2013). The committee thought it would be a good idea to capitalize on having those visitors see other venues in Greenwood.

Dick Stowe, chair of the Tourist and Conventions Committee, served as the first Festival Chairman, and Judy Funderburk of Bennettsville was crowned Princess of Flowers. During the festival's early years, admission was free to most events, including the Park Seed gardens and open house, arts and craft show, photo exhibit, military band concerts and other popular attractions.

Since then, the festival has grown to include a wide array of activities, many added under the leadership of Frank Cuda, who was Festival Director from 1992 to 2006. In 2007, the festival celebrated its 40th anniversary and welcomed Kay Self as the new executive director.

In 2008, the South Carolina Festival of Flowers introduced a new logo celebrating its Carolina roots. The logo features yellow jessamine (the state flower) encircling the words "Festival of Flowers" with two Carolina wrens (the state bird) perched below.

Also in 2008, the Topiary Project was launched, which has become the signature event. Presently, there are 42 topiaries on the square in Greenwood.

Then in 2009, the festival gained regional recognition by winning four Excellence Awards at the Carolina Showfest Convention. The awards were for "Best Merchandise", "Best Website", and "Overall Event of the Year" for South and North Carolina, and Executive Director Kay Self was recognized as "South Carolina Director of the Year".

Ellesor G. Holder took the helm in 2011 for the 44th Festival of Flowers. She rebranded the festival with a more distinctive and contemporary logo which symbolized the diversity and floral history of the festival. Under Holder's leadership, the festival received the SC Festival & Event Association's Excellence Award, 2013 Event of the Year. She also garnered two Silver Awards for the festival's 2013 TV ad and mobile application/website at the International Festival and Events Association Conference.

The South Carolina Festival of Flowers continues to be named one of the Southeast Tourism Society's "Top Twenty Events".

Attendance at the festival has steadily grown, reaching a record of over 80,000 visitors in the past few years. In 2016, the economic impact of the Festival of Flowers was $3,300,000.

The South Carolina Festival of Flowers is a division of the Greenwood Chamber of Commerce and shares the same board of directors.

Festival of Discovery
The South Carolina Festival of Discovery is the premier event of the year sponsored by the Uptown Greenwood Development Corporation. The event started in 2000, celebrating the history, culture, food, arts, crafts, music and people of South Carolina and Greenwood County.

The Festival of Discovery's "Blues Cruise" celebrates the sound of the blues, with numerous musical artists performing at Uptown Greenwood restaurants and venues, while the Kansas City Barbeque Society (KCBS) BBQ and Hash Cook-Off focuses on the rich tradition of Carolina barbecue.

Registered historic sites

The Barratt House, J. Wesley Brooks House, Lander College Old Main Building, Magnolia Cemetery, Mt. Pisgah A.M.E. Church, Old Greenwood Cemetery, Old Greenwood High School, James C. Self House, Stony Point, Sunnyside, Tabernacle Cemetery, and the Vance-Maxwell House are listed on the National Register of Historic Places.

Government

Greenwood is governed via a council-manager system. The mayor is elected at-large. The city council consists of six nonpartisan members who are each elected from one of six single-member district wards. The current mayor of Greenwood is Brandon Smith. Mr. Smith was sworn in on Monday, November 19, 2018. He won election for the office vacated by Mayor Welborn Adams who decided not to seek re-election.

Education

The city of Greenwood is a part of Greenwood County School District 50, and offers public schooling up to the secondary level, including career and technology education.

Greenwood District 50 consists of the following schools:

Secondary (with enrollment):
 Greenwood High School (1,700)
 Emerald High School  (950)

Middle:
 Westview Middle School
 Brewer Middle School
 Northside Middle School

Elementary:
 Greenwood Early Childhood Center (formerly East End Elementary)
 Hodges Elementary
 Lakeview Elementary
 Mathews Elementary
 Merrywood Elementary
 Eleanor S. Rice Elementary (formerly Oakland Elementary)
 Pinecrest Elementary
 Dr. Benjamin E. Mays Elementary School (formerly Springfield Elementary)
 Woodfields Elementary

Private schools:
 Greenwood Christian School
 Eastside Christian School
 Palmetto Christian Academy
 Cambridge Academy

Post-secondary:
 Lander University
 Piedmont Technical College

Greenwood has a public library, a branch of the Greenwood County Library System.

Infrastructure
The city is served by Greenwood County Airport.

Notable people

 Gaines Adams, former defensive end for NFL's Chicago Bears
 Pinky Babb, coached Greenwood High School for 39 years, is among top 20 nationally in high school football victories
 Robert Brooks, former NFL wide receiver for Green Bay Packers and Denver Broncos.
 Tomiko Brown-Nagin, legal historian and professor at Harvard Law School of Harvard University
 Ben Coates, starting tight end for New England Patriots 1991–99, ranked fourth in receptions at that position in NFL all-time
 Johnny Corley, soul singer best known for his 1967 hit Boogaloo Down Broadway
 Leroy Jenkins, Televangelist
 William Jennings Bryan Dorn, former U.S. and state representative
 John W. Drummond, South Carolina businessman and legislator
 Armanti Edwards, starting quarterback for Appalachian State Mountaineers football team, winner of 2008 & 2009 Walter Payton Award given to  top Football Championship Subdivision offensive player; drafted by Carolina Panthers with 3rd round, 25th pick in 2010 NFL Draft
 John Gilliam, former NFL wide receiver, four-time Pro Bowler
 Allisha Gray, 2017 WNBA Rookie of the Year
 Keith Harling, country music artist
 Grainger Hines, Greenwood native and actor, once married to Michelle Phillips of The Mamas and The Papas
 William "Hootie" Johnson, former chairman of Augusta National golf course
 Courtney Khondabi, QVC host
 Gregg Marshall, head coach of Wichita State University's men's basketball program
 Benjamin Mays, minister, educator, scholar, social activist, mentor to Martin Luther King Jr, and president of Morehouse College
 John McKissick, national high school football leader in coaching victories, (Summerville, S.C., High School)
 Sam Montgomery, drafted by Houston Texans in third round of 2013 NFL draft out of LSU
 Josh Norman, drafted by Carolina Panthers in 2012 as cornerback out of Coastal Carolina
 Marrio Norman, football player
 George Singleton, author
 Jerome Singleton, Paralympic athlete
 Chino Smith, former Negro leagues player, named one of S.C.'s top 100 athletes by Sports Illustrated
 D. J. Swearinger, all-SEC conference safety for South Carolina Gamecocks, drafted by Houston Texans
 The Swingin' Medallions, 1960s beach music group best known for their hit Double Shot (Of My Baby's Love)
 Bill Voiselle, professional baseball player.

References

External links

 Greenwood County
 Greenwood Chamber of Commerce

 
Cities in South Carolina
Cities in Greenwood County, South Carolina
Populated places established in 1897
County seats in South Carolina
1897 establishments in South Carolina